, formerly known as Pro Wrestling Zero-One and Pro Wrestling Zero1-Max (stylized as Pro Wrestling ZERO-ONE and Pro Wrestling Zero1-MAX, respectively) and often referred to simply as Zero1, is a Japanese professional wrestling promotion founded in 2001. It was affiliated with the National Wrestling Alliance (NWA) from 2001 until late 2004 and briefly reaffiliated with the NWA in 2011. It was affiliated with AWA Superstars of Wrestling (AWA) from 2005 until late 2007 and has been affiliated with the United Wrestling Network (UWN) since 2017.

History
The promotion was founded by former New Japan Pro-Wrestling (NJPW) stars Shinya Hashimoto and Shinjiro Otani. In 2000, Hashimoto proposed an independent promotion within NJPW called "New Japan Pro-Wrestling Zero", but the idea was shot down. When Hashimoto was fired by NJPW in November 2000, he registered the Pro Wrestling Zero-One name.

In its early years, Zero1 had working agreements with Pro Wrestling Noah (Noah), All Japan Pro Wrestling (AJPW), NJPW, Riki Pro, Hustle, Big Mouth Loud, King's Road, and Dragondoor, which enabled Zero1 wrestlers to challenge for and hold the other promotions' titles. The promotion also operated their own dojo, which was referred to as the "Takeshiba Coliseum".

On November 30, 2004, Shinya Hashimoto gave up ownership of the promotion, telling the press that due to financial problems he had decided to step away from the company. A new parent company "First On Stage" was formed consisting of president Yoshiyuki Nakamura, ring announcer Oki Okidata, Shinjiro Otani and a company named Baltic Curry. First On Stage renamed the promotion to Pro Wrestling Zero1-Max, with Otani and Nakamura taking over the promotion's general operations. Among other major changes made to the promotion's structure was the decision to join AWA Superstars of Wrestling (AWA) as the alliance's only Japanese member. Due to  their new affiliation with the AWA, the promotion's previous National Wrestling Alliance (NWA) affiliation was given to rival promotion NJPW.

Since April 2005, Zero1 has held yearly pay-per-view events at the Yasukuni Shrine, which is controversial for its relation to World War II. Larger Japanese wrestling promotions like NJPW, AJPW, and Noah have traditionally stayed away from such venues due to their controversial nature.

On September 12, 2006, Zero1-Max joined 12 other wrestling companies to form the Global Professional Wrestling Alliance (GPWA), a professional wrestling alliance that intended to "foster an environment of cooperation rather than competition." The alliance planned to hold occasional "Super Shows" where all member promotions would send wrestlers to compete under the GPWA banner. Noah's CEO Mitsuharu Misawa was inaugurated as the first chairman of the GPWA, while Zero1-Max's Yoshiyuki Nakamura was announced as the alliance's president. The GPWA folded in 2009.

In 2008, the promotion shortened its name to Pro Wrestling Zero1. In 2011, the promotion returned to the NWA as their Japanese territory. In March 2011, NWA presented Zero1 with the NWA Pan-Pacific Premium Heavyweight Championship in celebration of the promotion's tenth anniversary. In July, Daisuke Sekimoto won the Fire Festival to become the first NWA Pan-Pacific Premium Heavyweight champion. Later in 2011, Zero1 left the NWA, renaming their NWA-branded championships to "New Wrestling Alliance" championships.

Following their 2011 departure from the NWA, Zero1 launched an American affiliate, Zero1 USA, taking over the promotion previously known as NWA Midwest. In 2012, an Australian division of Zero1, known as Zero1 Australia, opened in Adelaide taking over what was previously known as NWA Pro Australia; in 2014 the relationship between Zero1 and Zero1 Australia ended with the Australian-based promotion renaming to Wrestle Rampage. Later in 2012 the Zero1 Hong Kong and Zero1 Mexico branches opened. In 2013, Yoshiyuki Nakamura opened a new division of Zero1 in Belarus.

On December 17, 2013, Zero1 announced a corporate restructuring taking place at the start of the 2014.

During a September 16, 2016 press conference, Dream On Stage was announced as Zero1's new parent company. Also announced was a partnership between Zero1 and Akebono's Ōdō company. On May 22, 2017, Zero1 partnered with the United Wrestling Network to become the group's official Japanese affiliate. On July 3, 2018, it was announced that the promotion be undergoing a management change, with Yoshitaka Ono stepping down as the CEO. Katsumi Sasazaki would be appointed the representative director and president of the promotion, while Shinjiro Otani took on the chairman of the board position and Masato Tanaka and Kohei Sato split the vice-president role of the promotion.

On February 1, 2020, Zero1 president Kazuhiro Iwamoto announced that the ownership of the promotion would be transferred from the previous management company Dream On Stage to iFD. Iwamoto additionally announced a plan to reform the promotion, which would include holding a show in the Ryōgoku Kokugikan on April 13, 2021, as part of the promotion's 20th anniversary, with a further goal of holding a show in the Roygoku Kokugikan annually, while also providing Zero1 wrestlers with fixed contracts and social security. 

During a hiatus caused by the COVID-19 pandemic, the promotion suffered from severe financial problems. Kazuhiro Iwamoto resigned from his position as president while wrestlers Tatsuhito Takaiwa, Ikuto Hidaka, and Kohei Sato all departed the promotion. In July 2020, it was announced that the company was acquired by Daiko Holdings Group. That same month, they hired former Frontier Martial-Arts Wrestling women's wrestler Megumi Kudo as their general manager.

Personnel

Championships

Pro Wrestling Zero1

Zero1 USA

Super Fireworks Pro Wrestling

No longer promoted / inactive

Tournaments
Zero1 holds a heavyweight tournament every summer in the last week of July called the "Fire Festival" (Himatsuri) where the winner holds the "Fire Sword" (a katana) for a whole year until the next summer's tournament. They also hold a Yasukuni Shrine show every April and a yearly junior tournament called the "Tenkaichi Jr."

Affiliates

See also

Professional wrestling in Japan
List of professional wrestling promotions in Japan
List of National Wrestling Alliance territories

References

External links
 
 Zero1 English language website

 
2001 establishments in Japan
Japanese professional wrestling promotions
National Wrestling Alliance members